Sébastien Demorand (August 4, 1969 – January 21, 2020) was a French journalist and food critic.

Early life and career 
Sébastien Demorand was born in Harare, Zimbabwe, the son of diplomat Jacques Demorand, who worked in the United States, Belgium, Morocco and Japan. He was the brother of journalist and radio presenter Nicolas Demorand and sculptor Catherine Demorand.

After studying at the Paris-Sorbonne University graduating with a degree in political science, and two years at the CFJ (Centre de Formation des Journalistes) in Paris, he joined Europe 1 and the food guide Gault et Millau. Independent since then, he collaborated for Régal and Fooding. He was a columnist for RTL and the magazine L'Optimum.

MasterChef 
Since 2010, he was a member of the jury in the French version MasterChef on TF1. He was the only food critic among the chefs Frédéric Anton, Yves Camdeborde and Amandine Chaignot (since 2013). He was fluent in English and also appeared as a special guest in episode 18 of the second season of MasterChef US.

Books 
Sébastien Demorand, Emmanuel Rubin, Cantines: Recettes cultes corrigées par les chefs, A. Viénot, 2006, 146 pages
Bénédict Beaugé, Sébastien Demorand, Les cuisines de la critique gastronomique, Éditions du Seuil, 2009, 113 pages
Sébastien Demorand, Vincent Sorel, Petit traité de philosophie charcutière, Éditions du Rouergue, 2011, 68 pages

References

External links 

 Cuit-Cuit, official blog of Bénédict Beaugé and Sébastien Demorand 

1969 births
2020 deaths
French male journalists
French food writers
Paris-Sorbonne University alumni
People from Harare
French male non-fiction writers
Deaths from cancer in France
Burials at Père Lachaise Cemetery
Television judges